The Oratory of St Joseph (Oratorio di Santo Giuseppe) is a series of two 16th-century small chapels or prayer halls located in Via Francesco Barocci #57, in Urbino, Region of the Marche, Italy.

History
It was built from 1503 to 1515 for a confraternity founded in 1500 by the Franciscan friar Gerolamo Recalchi of Verona. The confraternity had the patronage of Guidobaldo I da Montefeltro and Elisabetta Gonzaga. The oratory was refurbished in the 1680s, with the patronage of the aristocratic Albani family of Urbino. Among former brothers of the confraternity were numbered artists from the family of the Viti, Urbani, Brandani, and Roncalli. Other members included the Duke Francesco Maria I Della Rovere and James III Stuart. 

The oratory has a Presepe (1545) by Federico Brandani, and a bas-relief of a Madonna and Child by Domenico Roselli. Other decorations include paintings by Carlo Roncalli and sculptures of St Joseph by Giuseppe Lironi and a Madonna col Bambino (1730) by Maurizio Sparagnini. In the sacristy, some landscapes were painted by Alessio De Marchis.

References

Roman Catholic churches in Urbino
16th-century Roman Catholic church buildings in Italy
Roman Catholic churches completed in 1515
Renaissance architecture in le Marche